Marcoola is a coastal town and locality in the Sunshine Coast Region, Queensland, Australia.

Geography
Marcoola includes part of the pristine Mount Coolum National Park, borders with the Maroochy River and is part of the Maroochy River Catchment Area and includes urban developments of Town of Seaside and Mount Coolum Shores.

Sunshine Coast Airport is located within the suburban boundary of Marcoola.

History
The name Marcoola was a coined name and reflects its location between MARoochydore and COOLum.

In March 2009 a ship called, MV Pacific Adventurer, spilled 270 tonnes of oil off the coast of Brisbane causing damage to the Marcoola coastline among other areas and costing the state millions of dollars.

Aboriginal and/or Torres Strait Islander people made up 2.6% of the population.

Environment
Many species persist in this region, including flora such as paperbark open forest and woodland, Banksia aemula (Wallum Banksia) woodland, and open heathland. There is also a population of the endangered Mount Emu she-oak.

The region provides essential habitat for Ground Parrots which are regularly recorded and it is believed a subpopulation between 15 and 19 birds exists in Marcoola, making this the largest subpopulation within the Sunshine Coast and consequently important for the species persistence. Many other popular bird species have also been recorded in the area in recent years.

Ecosystem services in the region contribute to improved water quality of the Maroochy River by removing nutrient loads, retaining floodwaters and maintaining local flows before flowing directly into the sea. Other benefits include the high value to wildlife and by providing habitat refuge. The area also provides critical habitat for species which rely on the area for breeding and feeding (such as acid frogs, the 'vulnerable' wallum froglet, wallum sedge frog, wallum rocketfrog).

Marcoola coastal region is part of the Australian Commonwealth's, Temperate East Marine Region, and consists of several 'nationally important wetlands' and 'protected area' locations.

References

External links

 

Suburbs of the Sunshine Coast Region
Coastline of Queensland
Localities in Queensland